Mirari Uria Gabilondo (born 1 January 2003) is a Spanish footballer who plays as a forward for Real Sociedad.

Club career
Mirari Uria started her career at Lagun Onak.

References

External links
Profile at Real Sociedad

2003 births
Living people
Women's association football forwards
Spanish women's footballers
People from Azpeitia
Sportspeople from Gipuzkoa
Footballers from the Basque Country (autonomous community)
Real Sociedad (women) players
Primera División (women) players
Spain women's youth international footballers